Alta (Spanish for "Upper") is a small unincorporated community and census-designated place (CDP) in Placer County, California, United States, about  northeast of Auburn. The village is located off Interstate 80 and along the historical First transcontinental railroad. The ZIP code is 95701 and the area code 530. One of the few buildings other than private residences is the Alta-Dutch Flat Grammar School serving kindergarten through eighth grade students. The high school that serves Alta is named Colfax High School. Colfax High School is 11 miles southwest in the incorporated town of Colfax. The population of Alta was 615 at the 2020 census.

A historical California place once named Alta was located in San Diego County near the present-day La Mesa–El Cajon boundary.  This historical place was along the San Diego and Arizona Eastern Railway, now the San Diego Trolley Orange Line, at its Murray Drive undercrossing in La Mesa. The community was named after the Spanish word meaning "upper" or "high".

Geography
According to the United States Census Bureau, the CDP covers an area of 2.4 square miles (6.2 km2), 99.72% of it land, and 0.28% of it water.

Climate
Alta has a hot-summer Mediterranean climate (Köppen climate classification Csa) that is characterized by cool, wet winters and hot, dry summers (Köppen climate classification Csa).

Demographics

The 2010 United States Census reported that Alta had a population of 610. The racial makeup of Alta was 592 (97.0%) White, 1 (0.2%) African American, 3 (0.5%) Native American, 5 (0.8%) Asian, 1 (0.2%) Pacific Islander, 2 (0.3%) from other races, and 6 (1.0%) from two or more races. Hispanic or Latino of any race were 23 persons (3.8%).

The Census reported that 594 people (97.4% of the population) lived in households, 16 (2.6%) lived in non-institutionalized group quarters, and 0 (0%) were institutionalized.

There were 242 households, out of which 70 (28.9%) had children under the age of 18 living in them, 141 (58.3%) were opposite-sex married couples living together, 17 (7.0%) had a female householder with no husband present, 14 (5.8%) had a male householder with no wife present.  There were 18 (7.4%) unmarried opposite-sex partnerships, and 1 (0.4%) same-sex married couples or partnerships. 56 households (23.1%) were made up of individuals, and 19 (7.9%) had someone living alone who was 65 years of age or older. The average household size was 2.45.  There were 172 families (71.1% of all households); the average family size was 2.89.

The population was spread out, with 127 people (20.8%) under the age of 18, 37 people (6.1%) aged 18 to 24, 122 people (20.0%) aged 25 to 44, 237 people (38.9%) aged 45 to 64, and 87 people (14.3%) who were 65 years of age or older.  The median age was 46.9 years. For every 100 females, there were 112.5 males.  For every 100 females age 18 and over, there were 105.5 males.

The homeowner vacancy rate was 1.5%; the rental vacancy rate was 7.5%.  469 people (76.9% of the population) lived in owner-occupied housing units and 125 people (20.5%) lived in rental housing units.

References

External links
Sierra Nevada Virtual Museum: Alta

Unincorporated communities in California
Census-designated places in Placer County, California
Census-designated places in California